Wesley Danilo Morais dos Santos (born 23 April 1993), known as Buba, is a Brazilian football player who plays for French club FC Gobelins.

Club career
He made his professional debut in the Campeonato Pernambucano for Porto de Caruaru on 25 January 2011 in a game against Náutico.

References

External links

1993 births
People from Caruaru
Living people
Brazilian footballers
Brazilian expatriate footballers
Clube Atlético do Porto players
Mogi Mirim Esporte Clube players
Goiânia Esporte Clube players
Sport Club Corinthians Paulista players
Oeste Futebol Clube players
América Futebol Clube (RN) players
Mirassol Futebol Clube players
Portimonense S.C. players
FC Imabari players
Varzim S.C. players
S.C. Praiense players
Paris 13 Atletico players
Campeonato Brasileiro Série B players
Liga Portugal 2 players
Championnat National 2 players
Expatriate footballers in Japan
Expatriate footballers in Portugal
Expatriate footballers in France
Brazilian expatriate sportspeople in Japan
Brazilian expatriate sportspeople in Portugal
Brazilian expatriate sportspeople in France
Association football forwards
Sportspeople from Pernambuco